Paweł Lechowicz is a Polish civil servant who serves the Ambassador of the Republic of Poland to Kuwait since December 2017.

Life 
Paweł Lechowicz in 1991 has graduated from history at the University of Łódź specializing in history of international relations.

After graduation he started his career at the Office for State Protection, office in Łódź. From 2001 to 2004 he worked for the Supreme Audit Office. Between 2006 and 2008, as the colonel, he was the deputy head of Foreign Intelligence Agency. Between 2009 and 2013 he worked at the embassy in Washington, D.C. where he was responsible for security issues, especially of the countries of the Persian Gulf Basin. After that, he was the deputy director of the Inspectorate of the Foreign Service and the director of the Bureau for the Protection of Classified Information.

Since December 2017 he serves as the Ambassador of Poland to Kuwait, accredited additionally to Bahrain.

Honours 

 Knight's Cross of the Order of Polonia Restituta
 Gold Cross of Merit (2002)
 Silver Cross of Merit (2006)
 Bronze Cross of Merit (1999)
 Gold Medal of Merit for National Defence
 Legion of Merit

References 

1960s births
Ambassadors of Poland to Kuwait
Knights of the Order of Polonia Restituta
Living people
Recipients of the Gold Cross of Merit (Poland)
Recipients of the Silver Cross of Merit (Poland)
Recipients of the Bronze Cross of Merit (Poland)
Recipients of the Legion of Merit
Recipients of the Medal of Merit for National Defence
University of Łódź alumni